The Agedabia concentration camp was an Italian concentration camp established in Ajdabiya (also known as Agedabia) in the Italian colony of Libya during the Pacification of Libya that occurred from 1928 to 1932. The camp is recorded as having a population of 10,000 people.

See also
 Italian concentration camps
 Italian concentration camps in Libya
 Italian Libya
 Pacification of Libya

References

External links
 Campo di Concentramento Agedabia, I Campi Fascisti

Italian concentration camps
Italian Libya